Kalinowski's mouse opossum or the Peru gracile mouse opossum (Hyladelphys kalinowskii) is a species of opossum in the family Didelphidae. It is found in Brazil, French Guiana, Guyana, and Peru. Its natural habitat is subtropical or tropical moist lowland forests at elevations up to 1000 m.

This is the only living species in the genus Hyladelphys. It was removed from the genus Gracilinanus in 2001.

References

Opossums
Mammals described in 1992
Taxonomy articles created by Polbot